Paul Kurt Malisch (June 18, 1881 – April 9, 1970) was a German breaststroke swimmer, who competed in the 1912 Summer Olympics. He was born in Landsberg an der Warthe. In the 200 metre breaststroke competition he won the bronze medal next to his teammates Walter Bathe and Wilhelm Lützow. In the 400 metre breaststroke event he finished fourth.

References

External links
Paul Malisch's profile at Sports Reference.com
Paul Malisch's profile at Schwimm Blog Berlin 

1881 births
1970 deaths
Sportspeople from Gorzów Wielkopolski
People from the Province of Brandenburg
German male breaststroke swimmers
German male swimmers
Olympic swimmers of Germany
Swimmers at the 1912 Summer Olympics
Olympic bronze medalists for Germany
Olympic bronze medalists in swimming
Medalists at the 1912 Summer Olympics
19th-century German people
20th-century German people